Prema Kanuka is a 1981 Indian Telugu-language drama film, produced by Venkat Akkineni, Nagarjuna Akkineni under Annapurna Studios banner and directed by K. Raghavendra Rao. It stars Akkineni Nageswara Rao, Sridevi with music composed by Chakravarthy.

Plot
The film begins on Raja Shekaram (Akkineni Nageswara Rao) an artist, lands at an estate for his portrayal and settles in a dock house. One night, he spots something suspicious and discovers it as a beautiful village girl Gowri (Madhu Malini) who night halts there. Raja praises her beauty and paints her picture when she starts loving him. It irks, Sandhya (Sridevi) a vainglory woman, daughter of a devious & materialistic person Janthuvula Jaganatham (Rao Gopal Rao). So, she destroys the paintings when angered Raja moves to shut her down. At that moment, astonishingly, he gets a remembrance of reincarnation and also makes Sandhya believe it. Eventually, Mohan (Mohan Babu) a malicious, is the nephew of Jaganatham, performs anti-social activities in that area. He aspires to marry Sandhya and also keeps an evil eye on Gowri but Raja always puts a check on him. Meanwhile, learning regarding Raja & Sandhya's love affair Jaganatham gives his approval for their espousal. Parallelly, Raja couples up Gowri with a guy Kumar (Chalapathi Rao), but unfortunately, he turns as henchmen of Mohan. Right now, he surrenders Gowri to him when Raja rescues her. Exploiting it, Mohan denounces Raja when Jaganatham eagerly queries him. At that juncture, as a flabbergast, Raja declares himself as the son of the bungalow's previous owner Bhushaiah (Satyanarayana). Hearing it, Jaganatham dodges out and proclaims Raja as a defrauder before Sandhya when shockingly, she announces as pregnant. Here, Sandhya misconstrues Raja and decides to get aborted, knowing it, Gowri rushes to Raja. On the way, Mohan molests her, before dying, she informs Raja, regarding the barbarous deed of Mohan and Sandhya too. Immediately, Raja moves and enlightens Sandhya by showing his insane sister Seeta (Pushpalatha) suffering in a mental hospital. Actually, in the past, Jaganatham deceived Seeta which lead to the destruction of their family. Hence, he made this play to teach Jaganatham a lesson. Listening to it, Sandhya understands Raja's virtue and both of them make Jaganatham repent. At present, Raja turns as CBI Officer who is specially appointed to catch illegal activities of Mohan. Be cognizant of it, Mohan kidnaps Seeta along with Jaganatham when she retrieves her memory. At last, Raja ceases Mohan and Jaganatham also plead pardon. Finally, the movie ends on a happy note with the marriage of Raja & Sandhya.

Cast
Akkineni Nageswara Rao as Raja Shekaram
Sridevi as Sandhya
Rao Gopal Rao as Janthuvula Jaganatham
Satyanarayana as Bhushaiah
Allu Ramalingaiah as All in all Anjaneyulu
Mohan Babu as Mohan
Prabhakar Reddy  as Veeraiah
Music Director Chakravarthy as Appa Rao 
Chalapathi Rao as Kumar 
Narra Venkateswara Rao as Jaggu 
Madhumalini as Gowri
Manorama as Aandallu
Subhashini as Rani
Pushpalatha as Seeta
Master Harish as Young Raja Shekaram

Crew
Art: G. V. Subba Rao
Choreography: Saleem
Fights: Raghavulu
Dialogues: Satyanand
Lyrics: Acharya Atreya
Playback: S. P. Balasubrahmanyam, P. Susheela, S. P. Sailaja
Music: Chakravarthy
Story: Guhanathan
Editing: Kotagiri Venkateswara Rao
Cinematography: K. S. Prakash
Producer: Venkat Akkineni, Nagarjuna Akkineni
Screenplay - Director: K. Raghavendra Rao
Banner: Annapurna Studios
Release Date: 27 June 1981

Soundtrack

Music composed by Chakravarthy. Lyrics were written by Acharya Atreya.

Others
 VCDs and DVDs on - VOLGA Videos, Hyderabad

References

External links
 

Indian drama films
Films directed by K. Raghavendra Rao
Films scored by K. Chakravarthy
1981 drama films
1981 films
1980s Telugu-language films